The H. P. Page House is a historic house located in Newton, Massachusetts.

Description and history 
The -story wood-frame house was built c. 1850, and is a detailed example of a Greek Revival workers' cottage. The gable end is pedimented, and an entablature wraps around the house, supported by corner pilasters. The main entrance is flanked by sidelight windows and panelled pilasters, and topped by antransom window and entablature.

The house was listed on the National Register of Historic Places on September 4, 1986.

See also
 National Register of Historic Places listings in Newton, Massachusetts

References

Houses on the National Register of Historic Places in Newton, Massachusetts
Houses completed in 1850
Greek Revival houses in Massachusetts